Luleh Daraq-e Hajj Najaf (also Romanized as Lūleh Daraq-e Ḩājj Najaf; also known as Lūleh Darreh) is a village in Qeshlaq-e Shomali Rural District, in the Central District of Parsabad County, Ardabil Province, Iran. At the 2006 census, its population was 424, in 91 families.

References 

Towns and villages in Parsabad County